Joseph Lamb may refer to:

 Joseph Lamb (composer) (1887–1960), American composer of ragtime music
 Joseph Lamb (footballer), English football manager
 Joseph Lamb (politician) (1873–1949), British politician
 Joseph Fairweather Lamb (1928–2015), Scottish physician
 Joe Lamb (1906–1982), ice hockey forward